Cossulus nedretus is a moth in the family Cossidae. It is found in eastern Turkey.

References

Natural History Museum Lepidoptera generic names catalog

Moths described in 2005
Cossinae
Moths of Asia